Szafarnia may refer to the following places:
Szafarnia, Kuyavian-Pomeranian Voivodeship (north-central Poland)
Szafarnia, Masovian Voivodeship (east-central Poland)
Szafarnia, Warmian-Masurian Voivodeship (north Poland)